Oxford is a city in Sumner County, Kansas, United States.  As of the 2020 census, the population of the city was 1,048.

History
Oxford was founded in 1871 at the site of a former trading post. Oxford was incorporated as a city in October 17, 1879. It was named after Oxford University, in England. The founding city officials were Ben Smith (1831–1898) the elected mayor, Joseph Sleigh (1842–1924) the elected police judge, George Walton (1820–1902) the appointed city clerk.

When Oxford was known as Napawalla, a post office had been established and Lafe Binkley (1842–1917) was postmaster.  When Oxford was founded, a new post office was opened and  T.E. Clark was appointed postmaster.

Geography
Oxford is located at  (37.274841, -97.169825). It is approximately thirty miles south of Wichita.

Climate
The climate in this area is characterized by hot, humid summers and generally mild to cool winters.  According to the Köppen Climate Classification system, Oxford has a humid subtropical climate, abbreviated "Cfa" on climate maps.

Demographics

2010 census
As of the census of 2010, there were 1,049 people, 434 households, and 292 families residing in the city. The racial makeup of the city was 94.9% White, 1.0% African American, 1.1% Native American, 0.4% Asian, 0.7% from other races, and 1.9% from two or more races. Hispanic or Latino of any race were 2.2% of the population.

There were 434 households, of which 27.4% had children under the age of 18 living with them, 56.2% were married couples living together, 8.1% had a female householder with no husband present, 3.0% had a male householder with no wife present, and 32.7% were non-families. 30.0% of all households were made up of individuals, and 12.4% had someone living alone who was 65 years of age or older. The average household size was 2.32 and the average family size was 2.83.

The median age in the city was 44.7 years. 21.9% of residents were under the age of 18; 6.7% were between the ages of 18 and 24; 22.1% were from 25 to 44; 29.7% were from 45 to 64; and 19.5% were 65 years of age or older. The gender makeup of the city was 48.7% male and 51.3% female.

2000 census
As of the census of 2000, there were 1,173 people, 465 households, and 327 families residing in the city. The racial makeup of the city was 95.99% White, 0.09% African American, 1.71% Native American, 0.17% Asian, 0.26% from other races, and 1.79% from two or more races. Hispanic or Latino of any race were 1.28% of the population.

There were 465 households, out of which 33.8% had children under the age of 18 living with them, 57.0% were married couples living together, 11.0% had a female householder with no husband present, and 29.5% were non-families. 28.6% of all households were made up of individuals, and 15.3% had someone living alone who was 65 years of age or older. The average household size was 2.43 and the average family size was 2.95.

In the city, the population was spread out, with 25.7% under the age of 18, 6.2% from 18 to 24, 26.5% from 25 to 44, 20.5% from 45 to 64, and 21.1% who were 65 years of age or older. The median age was 40 years. For every 100 females, there were 87.1 males. For every 100 females age 18 and over, there were 79.8 males.

The median income for a household in the city was $34,875, and the median income for a family was $42,500. Males had a median income of $36,250 versus $22,841 for females. The per capita income for the city was $16,479. About 4.3% of families and 5.8% of the population were below the poverty line, including 9.0% of those under age 18 and 1.9% of those age 65 or over.

Area attractions
 The Old Oxford Mill, near Oxford, build in 1875

Education
The community is served by Oxford USD 358 public school district.
 Oxford Jr/Sr High School, 515 N Water St.

Oxford High School has produced several championship sports teams recently: district champions in football, regional champions in baseball, and tournament champions in basketball.   Oxford High School has also produced academic Scholar's Bowl teams that have gone to state, in which it took 2nd place in 2008 and 4th in 2014.

Notable people
 Keitha Adams, (b1967), current Wichita State Shockers women's basketball head coach
 Vingie Roe (1879–1958), American novelist and screenwriter

See also
 1955 Great Plains tornado outbreak

References

Further reading

External links
 City of Oxford
 Oxford - Directory of Public Officials
 Oxford city map, KDOT

Cities in Sumner County, Kansas
Cities in Kansas
Wichita, KS Metropolitan Statistical Area
Kansas populated places on the Arkansas River